Isaya Mwita Charles is a Tanzanian politician planning and serving as the 17th and current Mayor of Dar es Salaam since March 21, 2016.  Prior to his appointment as mayor, he served at the Temeke Municipal Council as a cashier before contesting the general election for the Vijibweni Ward representative as Councilor at Kigamboni District in Dar es Salaam.[1]

Political views 
Isaya Mwita Charles is the Lord Mayor of Dar es Salaam City in The United Republic of Tanzania and a member of the CHADEMA, Isaya Mwita Charles was elected a Councilor on  2015.   On 21 March 2016 he was officially elected as the Mayor of Dar es Salaam City Council.

Early life
Isaya Mwita Charles was born in Tarime District, Mara the then Musoma Region, on 28 February 1974

Education 

From 1994 to 1997 Isaya Mwita Charles attended Secondary School in Tarime district and was awarded a certificate of Secondary Education (CSE).  Between July 2005 to May 2007, he attended the Aramain Secondary School where award a certificate of advance certificate of secondary Education (ACSE).  That was not the end, the late October 2008 to June 2011 he completed his first degree at the Mwalimu Julius K. Nyerere University.

Work

Criticism of creationism 

Isaya Mwita Charles is a prominent critic of creationism, a religious belief that humanity, life, and the universe were created not for anything but to live together as one community and to share, exchange, explaining  and to trust each other as the son and daughter of Male and a Female. Due to that philosophy as a Lord Mayor he decided to establish a common creatives to people creating and sharing responsibility, credibility and accountability.

Personal life 
Isaya Mwita Charles is married.

References

External links 
 

1968 births
University of Dar es Salaam alumni
Living people
Mayors of Dar es Salaam
People from Mara Region